Ljubaništa is a village along the shore of the Lake Ohrid in North Macedonia. The village is located near the Monastery of St. Naum and the border with Albania.

History 
Of all the Orthodox Macedonian villages located on the eastern side of Lake Ohrid, only Ljubaništa had family ties with Orthodox Albanians from Pogradec and Korçë in Albania.

Demographics
According to the 2002 census, the village had a total of 171 inhabitants. Ethnic groups in the village include:

Macedonians 169
Turks 1
Others 1

References

Villages in Ohrid Municipality